Młyny  is a village in the administrative district of Gmina Strzelno, within Mogilno County, Kuyavian-Pomeranian Voivodeship, in north-central Poland. As of the 2011 Polish census, it had a population of 122.

References

Villages in Mogilno County